= Inauguration of Manuel L. Quezon =

Inauguration of Manuel L. Quezon may refer to:

- First inauguration of Manuel L. Quezon, 1935
- Second inauguration of Manuel L. Quezon, 1941
- Third inauguration of Manuel L. Quezon, 1943
